Krystyna Strusiówna (1605-1647), was a Polish noblewoman.  She became infamous for the great scandal of 1625, in which she committed incest by marrying her nephew Adam Kalinowskim and eloped with him.

References

 Ilona Czamańska : Wiśniowieccy: Monografia rodu . Poznań: Wydawnictwo Poznańskie, 2007, s. 162.  .

17th-century Polish people
17th-century Polish women
1647 deaths
1605 births
Incest